Baotian Motorcycle Industrial Co. Ltd, or Jiangmen Sino-HongKong Baotian Motorcycle Industrial Co. Ltd., established in 1994, is a Chinese manufacturer of motorcycles and scooters. Baotian tuning is very popular in Finland.

Baotian UK has been operating since 2005 and has consistently topped the 50cc scooter sales chart. In January 2007, according to industry statistics, the Baotian BT49QT-9 was third best-selling two-wheeler.

Sole distribution of the brand was granted to Baotian UK in October 2007 and the brand is now distributed widely via a network of motorcycle and scooter dealers.

Models
 Baotian BT49QT-9
 Baotian BT49QT-11
 Baotian BT49QT-12 Rebel
 Baotian BT49QT-12 Rocky
 Baotian BT49QT-28A-13 Diablo 50cc twostroke with 1E40QMA engine (clone of the horizontal Minarelli 50cc)
 Baotian Eagle 50
 Baotian Falcon 50
 Baotian Tanco 125
 Baotian Citibike 125
 Baotian Tiger 50
 Baotian Flash 50
Baotian andrejn.7

References

External links 
Baotian Motorcycle Company

Motorcycle manufacturers of China
Scooter manufacturers
Chinese companies established in 1994
Companies based in Jiangmen
Chinese brands
Vehicle manufacturing companies established in 1994